The 2000 California Republican presidential primary was held on March 7, 2000. Governor George W. Bush of Texas won easily over Senator John McCain of Arizona and former Ambassador Alan Keyes.

At the time, California had a blanket primary, meaning all candidates of all parties were on the same ballot, but the state parties, exploiting a loophole in the election law, used color-coded ballots so that only votes from party members would count. Thus, many votes for McCain -- nearly 800,000 -- were discounted. It was thought by pundits that McCain could demonstrate his viability in a large Democratic state if he won the general primary; however, Bush still won a solid majority with all the non-Republican votes factored in.

Results

See also
 2000 California Democratic presidential primary
 2000 Republican Party presidential primaries

Notes

References

Republican primary
California
California Republican primaries